The 2021 Stony Brook Seawolves baseball team represents Stony Brook University during the 2021 NCAA Division I baseball season. The Seawolves play their home games at Joe Nathan Field as a member of the America East Conference They are led by head coach Matt Senk, in his 31st year as head coach.

Previous season

The 2020 Stony Brook Seawolves baseball team notched a 6–9 (0–0) regular-season record. The season prematurely ended on March 12, 2020, due to concerns over the COVID-19 pandemic.

Game log

References

External links 
 Stony Brook Baseball

Stony Brook Seawolves baseball seasons
Stony Brook Seawolves
Stony